Bhuiyan (also  Bhuiya, Bhuyan, Bhuya) is a surname found in Bangladesh and in India, especially in Assam. This surname is mostly used by Kalitas (Baro-Bhuyan) of Assam.

Etymology
Bhuiyan was a title used to refer to a landlord or chieftain. It originates from the Sanskrit word, Bhumi, meaning 'land'.

History

Assam
The origin of this group is shrouded in mystery. This original group is often referred to as the Adi Bhuyan, or the progenitor Bhuiyans. One of the earliest evidence of Bhuyans in Mlechchha dynasty during the 9th century reign of Balavarman III by using 'parcelization' of power. Historical record of Raut-Kuchi grant (1329 A.D.) shows that western Brahmaputra valley comes from Adi-Bhuiyan group's Purushottam Dasa grandfather Basudeva, who was a minister of Kamata king Indranarayan, who commanded a thousand men and war elephants. The grant also stated that, Basudeva obtainted glory of sovereignty with his wealth and valour. In the manuscript  Adi-charita (Old- Character), which mentions about the Adi-Bhuyan group. The progenitor Bhuiyans (Adi-Bhuiyans) ensconced in Chutiya Kingdom when Sukaphaa established the Ahom Kingdom in 1208. Adi- Bhuiyan group maintained status quo with most faith-based ideologies. Adi-Bhuiyan group's later foundation became known as Baro-Bhuyan chieftains.

Bengal
Many Bengali Bhuiyans claim descent from one of the Baro-Bhuyan chieftains. The Baro-Bhuyans of Bengal ruled and maintained an independent confederacy after the fall of the Bengal Sultanate's final Karrani dynasty.

Mughal histories, mainly the Akbarnama, the Ain-i-Akbari and the Baharistan-i-Ghaibi refers to the low-lying regions of Bengal as Bhati. This region includes the Bhagirathi to the Meghna River is Bhati, while others include Hijli, Jessore, Chandradwip and Barisal Division in Bhati. Keeping in view the theatre of warfare between the Bara-Bhuiyans and the Mughals, the Baharistan-i-Ghaibi mentions the limits of the area bounded by the Ichamati River in the west, the Ganges in the south, the Tripura to the east; Alapsingh pargana (in present Mymensingh District) and Baniachang (in greater Sylhet) in the north. The Bara-Bhuiyans rose to power in this region and put up resistance to the Mughals, until Islam Khan Chisti made them submit in the reign of Jahangir.

Cachar
The Bengali Mirashdars living in the former Kachari Kingdom were given titles by the Kachari Raja, which in modern-day acts as a surname for them.

Notables with the surname

Bhuyan
 Ajit Kumar Bhuyan, Indian journalist and Member of Parliament, Rajya Sabha
 Birendra Kumar Bhuyan, Indian Odia-language writer, poet and lyricist
 Jagadish Bhuyan, Indian student leader and politician, associated with the Assam Movement
 Jamal Bhuyan, Bangladeshi footballer, midfielder for Bangladesh
 Khwaja Nizamuddin Bhuyan, Bangladeshi officer in the Gonobahini
 Md Aminul Haque Bhuyan, vice chancellor of Shahjalal University of Science and Technology
 Mohammed Shamsul Hoque Bhuyan, MP for Chandpur-4
 Naba Bhuyan, Indian cricketer from Assam
 Nakul Chandra Bhuyan, Indian Assamese-language playwright, writer and historian
 Surya Kumar Bhuyan, Indian Assamese-language writer, historian and poet
 Prakash Bhuyan, American Physican-Scientist

Bhuiyan
 Abdul Gafur Bhuiyan, Bangladeshi politician, MP for Comilla-11
 Abdul Mannan Bhuiyan, Bangladeshi politician
 Abdus Sattar Bhuiyan, Bangladeshi politician, MP for Brahmanbaria-2
 Abul Khair Bhuiyan, Bangladeshi politician, MP for Lakshmipur-2
 Emdadul Haque Bhuiyan, Bangladeshi politician, MP for Narayanganj-2
 Iqbal Karim Bhuiyan, Chief of Army Staff (Bangladesh)
 Kamrul Hasan Bhuiyan, major general for Bangladesh Army
 Mahfuzul Hasan Bhuiyan, Bangladeshi architectural photographer
 Mohammad Shubid Ali Bhuiyan, Bangladesh Army officer
 M Musharraf Hossain Bhuiyan, Cabinet Secretary of Bangladesh
 Nurul Huq Bhuiyan, Bangladeshi activist
 Rais Bhuiyan, Bangladeshi-American activist
 Rawshan Yazdani Bhuiyan, Bangladesh Army officer
 Wadud Bhuiyan, Bangladeshi politician, MP for Chittagong Hill Tracts
 Waliur Rahman Bhuiyan, Bangladeshi businessman
 Zahirul Haque Bhuiyan Mohan, Bangladeshi politician, MP for Narsingdi-3

Other
 Ataur Rahman Mazarbhuiya, Indian politician, All India United Democratic Front politician
 Hazi Salim Uddin Barbhuiya, Indian politician MLA of Hailakandi
 Karim Uddin Barbhuiya, All India United Democratic Front politician
 Manas Bhunia, Indian politician, Member of Parliament, Rajya Sabha from West Bengal

See also
Abdul Mannan Bhuiyan Stadium, cricket ground
Baro-Bhuyan, the chieftains who ruled Bengal who have descendants which carry Bhuiyan as a surname
Khwaja Usman, a member of the Baro-Bhuyan

Notes

References

External links
 Bara-Bhuiyans at Banglapedia 

Bengali-language surnames